Actinoptera peregrina is a species of tephritid or fruit flies in the genus Actinoptera of the family Tephritidae.

Distribution
Malawi, Mozambique, Zimbabwe, Namibia, South Africa.

References

Tephritinae
Taxa named by Mario Bezzi
Insects described in 1905
Diptera of Africa